Humbligny is a commune in the Cher department in the Centre-Val de Loire region of France.

Geography
The village is the highest point in the northern part of the department and the source of two rivers, the Sauldre and Colin.

Population

Sights
 The church of St. Martin, dating from the thirteenth century.
 Houses dating from the 15th and 16th centuries.
A feudal motte.

See also
Communes of the Cher department

References

External links

Communes of Cher (department)